Copernicia rigida (commonly as the jata palm) is a type of palm endemic to eastern and central Cuba.

References

rigida
Trees of Cuba
Least concern plants